The name Hagupit has been used to name four tropical cyclones in the northwestern Pacific Ocean. The name was contributed by the Philippines and could be either a verb (meaning "to lash" or "to flog") or a noun (meaning "lashing", "beating").

 Tropical Storm Hagupit (2002) (T0218, 23W) — made landfall west of Macau
 Typhoon Hagupit (2008) (T0814, 18W, Nina) — Category 4 typhoon that made landfall in Guangdong province, China 
 Typhoon Hagupit (2014) (T1422, 22W, Ruby) — Category 5 super typhoon that traversed the Philippines
 Typhoon Hagupit (2020) (T2004, 03W, Dindo) - made landfall in Zhejiang, China

Pacific typhoon set index articles